Huson is a surname. Notable people with the surname include:

Dave Huson (born 1951), Jersey soccer player
Hobart Huson, American writer
Jeff Huson (born 1964), American baseball player
Paul Huson (born 1942), English writer

See also
Henry H. Huson House and Water Tower, house in Plymouth, Wisconsin, United States